ELAV-like protein 1 or HuR (human antigen R) is a protein that in humans is encoded by the ELAVL1 gene.

The protein encoded by this gene is a member of the ELAVL protein family. This encoded protein contains 3 RNA-binding domains and binds cis-acting AU-rich elements. One of its best-known functions is to stabilize mRNAs in order to regulate gene expression.

See also
RNA-Binding Protein
Y box binding protein 1 (YBX1), may form complex with ELAVL1 affecting mRNA stability during muscle-fiber formation

References

Further reading

External links 
 PDBe-KB provides an overview of all the structure information available in the PDB for Human ELAV-like protein 1